The 26th United States Congress was a meeting of the legislative branch of the United States federal government, consisting of the United States Senate and the United States House of Representatives. It met in Washington, D.C. from March 4, 1839, to March 4, 1841, during the third and fourth years of Martin Van Buren's presidency.  The apportionment of seats in the House of Representatives was based on the 1830 United States census. Both chambers had a Democratic majority.

Major events

 1839: The first state law permitting women to own property was passed in Jackson, Mississippi
 December 14–16, 1839: An election for the House speakership takes 11 ballots
 January 19, 1840: Captain Charles Wilkes circumnavigated Antarctica, claiming what becomes known as Wilkes Land for the United States.
 November 7, 1840: U.S. presidential election, 1840: William Henry Harrison defeated Martin Van Buren
 February 18, 1841: The first ongoing filibuster in the United States Senate began and lasted until March 11

Major legislation

Party summary

Senate

House of Representatives

Leadership

Senate 
President: Richard M. Johnson (D)
President pro tempore: William R. King (D)

House of Representatives 
Speaker: Robert M. T. Hunter (W) elected December 16, 1839, on the 11th ballot

Members
This list is arranged by chamber, then by state. Senators are listed by class, and representatives are listed by district.

Skip to House of Representatives, below

Senate
Senators were elected by the state legislatures every two years, with one-third beginning new six-year terms with each Congress. Preceding the names in the list below are Senate class numbers, which indicate the cycle of their election. In this Congress, Class 1 meant their term began with this Congress, requiring reelection in 1844; Class 2 meant their term ended with this Congress, requiring reelection in 1840; and Class 3 meant their term began in the last Congress, requiring reelection in 1842.

Alabama 
 2. William R. King (D)
 3. Clement C. Clay (D)

Arkansas 
 2. William S. Fulton (D)
 3. Ambrose H. Sevier (D)

Connecticut 
 1. Thaddeus Betts (W), until April 7, 1840
 Jabez W. Huntington (W), from May 4, 1840
 3. Perry Smith (D)

Delaware 
 1. Richard H. Bayard (W), until September 19, 1839
 Richard H. Bayard (W), from January 12, 1841
 2. Thomas Clayton (W)

Georgia 
 2. Wilson Lumpkin (D)
 3. Alfred Cuthbert (D)

Illinois 
 2. John M. Robinson (D)
 3. Richard M. Young (D)

Indiana 
 1. Albert S. White (W)
 3. Oliver H. Smith (W)

Kentucky 
 2. John J. Crittenden (W)
 3. Henry Clay (W)

Louisiana 
 2. Robert C. Nicholas (D)
 3. Alexander Mouton (D)

Maine 
 1. Reuel Williams (D)
 2. John Ruggles (D)

Maryland 
 1. William D. Merrick (W)
 3. John S. Spence (W), until October 24, 1840
 John L. Kerr (W), from January 5, 1841

Massachusetts 
 1. Daniel Webster (W), until February 22, 1841
 Rufus Choate (W), from February 23, 1841
 2. John Davis (W), until January 5, 1841
 Isaac C. Bates (W), from January 13, 1841

Michigan 
 1. Augustus S. Porter (W), from January 20, 1840
 2. John Norvell (D)

Mississippi 
 1. John Henderson (W)
 2. Robert J. Walker (D)

Missouri 
 1. Thomas H. Benton (D)
 3. Lewis F. Linn (D)

New Hampshire 
 2. Henry Hubbard (D)
 3. Franklin Pierce (D)

New Jersey 
 1. Samuel L. Southard (W)
 2. Garret D. Wall (D)

New York 
 1. Nathaniel P. Tallmadge (W), from January 14, 1840
 3. Silas Wright Jr. (D)

North Carolina 
 2. Bedford Brown (D), until November 16, 1840
 Willie P. Mangum (W), from November 25, 1840
 3. Robert Strange (D), until November 16, 1840
 William A. Graham (W), from November 25, 1840

Ohio 
 1. Benjamin Tappan (D)
 3. William Allen (D)

Pennsylvania 
 1. Daniel Sturgeon (D), from January 14, 1840
 3. James Buchanan (D)

Rhode Island 
 1. Nathan F. Dixon (W)
 2. Nehemiah R. Knight (W)

South Carolina 
 2. John C. Calhoun (D)
 3. William C. Preston (W)

Tennessee 
 1. Felix Grundy (D), November 19, 1839 – December 19, 1840
 Alfred O. P. Nicholson (D), from December 25, 1840
 2. Hugh Lawson White (W), until January 13, 1840
 Alexander O. Anderson (D), from February 26, 1840

Vermont 
 1. Samuel S. Phelps (W)
 3. Samuel Prentiss (W)

Virginia 
 1. William C. Rives (W), from January 18, 1841
 2. William H. Roane (D)

House of Representatives
The names of members of the House of Representatives are preceded by their district numbers.

Alabama 
 . Reuben Chapman (D)
 . David Hubbard (D)
 . George W. Crabb (W)
 . Dixon H. Lewis (D)
 . James Dellet (W)

Arkansas 
 . Edward Cross (D)

Connecticut 
 . Joseph Trumbull (W)
 . William L. Storrs (W), until June ???, 1840
 William W. Boardman (W), from December 7, 1840
 . Thomas W. Williams (W)
 . Thomas B. Osborne (W)
 . Truman Smith (W)
 . John H. Brockway (W)

Delaware 
 . Thomas Robinson Jr. (D)

Georgia 
All representatives were elected statewide on a general ticket.
 . Julius C. Alford (W)
 . Edward J. Black (W)
 . Walter T. Colquitt (W), until July 21, 1840
 Hines Holt (W), from February 1, 1841
 . Mark A. Cooper (W)
 . William C. Dawson (W)
 . Richard W. Habersham (W)
 . Thomas Butler King (W)
 . Eugenius A. Nisbet (W)
 . Lott Warren (W)

Illinois 
 . John Reynolds (D)
 . Zadok Casey (D)
 . John T. Stuart (W)

Indiana 
 . George H. Proffit (W)
 . John W. Davis (D)
 . John Carr (D)
 . Thomas Smith (D)
 . James Rariden (W)
 . William W. Wick (D)
 . Tilghman A. Howard (D), until July 1, 1840
 Henry S. Lane (W), from August 3, 1840

Kentucky 
 . Linn Boyd (D)
 . Philip Triplett (W)
 . Joseph R. Underwood (W)
 . Sherrod Williams (W)
 . Simeon H. Anderson (W), until August 11, 1840
 John B. Thompson (W), from December 7, 1840
 . Willis Green (W)
 . John Pope (W)
 . William J. Graves (W)
 . John White (W)
 . Richard Hawes (W)
 . Landaff W. Andrews (W)
 . Garrett Davis (W)
 . William O. Butler (D)

Louisiana 
 . Edward D. White (W)
 . Thomas W. Chinn (W)
 . Rice Garland (W), until July 21, 1840
 John Moore (W), from December 17, 1840

Maine 
 . Nathan Clifford (D)
 . Albert Smith (D)
 . Benjamin Randall (W)
 . George Evans (W), until March 3, 1841
 . Virgil D. Parris (D)
 . Hugh J. Anderson (D)
 . Joshua A. Lowell (D)
 . Thomas Davee (D)

Maryland 
The 4th district was a plural district with two representatives.
 . John Dennis (W)
 . Philip F. Thomas (D)
 . John T. H. Worthington (D)
 . James Carroll (D)
 . Solomon Hillen Jr. (D)
 . William Cost Johnson (W)
 . Francis Thomas (D)
 . Daniel Jenifer (W)

Massachusetts 
 . Abbott Lawrence (W), until September 18, 1840
 Robert C. Winthrop (W), from November 9, 1840
 . Leverett Saltonstall (W)
 . Caleb Cushing (W)
 . William Parmenter (D)
 . Levi Lincoln Jr. (W)
 . James C. Alvord (W), until September 27, 1839
 Osmyn Baker (W), from January 14, 1840
 . George N. Briggs (W)
 . William B. Calhoun (W)
 . William S. Hastings (W)
 . Henry Williams (D)
 . John Reed Jr. (W)
 . John Quincy Adams (W)

Michigan 
 . Isaac E. Crary (D)

Mississippi 
Both representatives were elected statewide on a general ticket.
 . Albert G. Brown (D)
 . Jacob Thompson (D)

Missouri 
Both representatives were elected statewide on a general ticket.
 . Albert G. Harrison (D), until September 7, 1839
 John Jameson (D), from December 12, 1839
 . John Miller (D)

New Hampshire 
All representatives were elected statewide on a general ticket.
 . Charles G. Atherton (D)
 . Edmund Burke (D)
 . Ira A. Eastman (D)
 . Tristram Shaw (D)
 . Jared W. Williams (D)

New Jersey 
All representatives were elected statewide on a general ticket.
 . William R. Cooper (D)
 . Philemon Dickerson (D)
 . Joseph Kille (D)
 . Joseph F. Randolph (W)
 . Daniel B. Ryall (D)
 . Peter D. Vroom (D)

New York 
There were four plural districts, the 8th, 17th, 22nd & 23rd had two representatives each, the 3rd had four representatives.
 . Thomas B. Jackson (D)
 . James De la Montanya (D)
 . Edward Curtis (W)
 . Moses H. Grinnell (W)
 . Ogden Hoffman (W)
 . James Monroe (W)
 . Gouverneur Kemble (D)
 . Charles Johnston (W)
 . Nathaniel Jones (D)
 . Rufus Palen (W)
 . John Ely (D)
 . Aaron Vanderpoel (D)
 . Hiram P. Hunt (W)
 . Daniel D. Barnard (W)
 . Anson Brown (W), until June 14, 1840
 Nicholas B. Doe (W), from December 7, 1840
 . David A. Russell (W)
 . Augustus C. Hand (D)
 . John Fine (D)
 . Peter J. Wagner (W)
 . Andrew W. Doig (D)
 . David P. Brewster (D)
 . John G. Floyd (D)
 . Thomas C. Chittenden (W)
 . John H. Prentiss (D)
 . Judson Allen (D)
 . John C. Clark (W)
 . Amasa Dana (D)
 . Stephen B. Leonard (D)
 . Nehemiah H. Earll (D)
 . Edward Rogers (D)
 . Christopher Morgan (W)
 . Theron R. Strong (D)
 . Francis Granger (W)
 . Meredith Mallory (D)
 . Thomas Kempshall (W)
 . Seth M. Gates (W)
 . Luther C. Peck (W)
 . Richard P. Marvin (W)
 . Millard Fillmore (W)
 . Charles F. Mitchell (W)

North Carolina 
 . Kenneth Rayner (W)
 . Jesse A. Bynum (D)
 . Edward Stanly (W)
 . Charles B. Shepard (D)
 . James I. McKay (D)
 . Micajah T. Hawkins (D)
 . Edmund Deberry (W)
 . William Montgomery (D)
 . John Hill (D)
 . Charles Fisher (D)
 . Henry W. Connor (D)
 . James Graham (W)
 . Lewis Williams (W)

Ohio 
 . Alexander Duncan (D)
 . John B. Weller (D)
 . Patrick G. Goode (W)
 . Thomas Corwin (W), until May 30, 1840
 Jeremiah Morrow (W), from October 13, 1840
 . William Doan (D)
 . Calvary Morris (W)
 . William K. Bond (W)
 . Joseph Ridgway (W)
 . William Medill (D)
 . Samson Mason (W)
 . Isaac Parrish (D)
 . Jonathan Taylor (D)
 . Daniel P. Leadbetter (D)
 . George Sweeny (D)
 . John W. Allen (W)
 . Joshua R. Giddings (W)
 . John Hastings (D)
 . David A. Starkweather (D)
 . Henry Swearingen (D)

Pennsylvania 
There were two plural districts, the 2nd had two representatives, the 4th had three representatives.
 . Lemuel Paynter (D)
 . John Sergeant (W)
 . George W. Toland (W)
 . Charles Naylor (W)
 . Edward Davies (AM)
 . John Edwards (AM)
 . Francis James (AM)
 . Joseph Fornance (D)
 . John Davis (D)
 . David D. Wagener (D)
 . Peter Newhard (D)
 . George M. Keim (D)
 . William Simonton (W)
 . James Gerry (D)
 . James Cooper (W)
 . William S. Ramsey (D), until October 17, 1840
 Charles McClure (D), from December 7, 1840
 . William W. Potter (D), until October 28, 1839
 George McCulloch (D), from November 20, 1839
 . David Petrikin (D)
 . Robert H. Hammond (D)
 . Samuel W. Morris (D)
 . Charles Ogle (AM)
 . Albert G. Marchand (D)
 . Enos Hook (D)
 . Isaac Leet (D)
 . Richard Biddle (AM), until July 21, 1840
 Henry M. Brackenridge (W), from October 13, 1840
 . William Beatty (D)
 . Thomas Henry (AM)
 . John Galbraith (D)

Rhode Island 
 . Robert B. Cranston (W)
 . Joseph L. Tillinghast (W)

South Carolina 
 . Isaac E. Holmes (D)
 . Robert Rhett (D)
 . John Campbell (D)
 . Sampson H. Butler (D)
 . Francis W. Pickens (D)
 . Waddy Thompson Jr. (W)
 . James Rogers (D)
 . Thomas D. Sumter (D)
 . John K. Griffin (D)

Tennessee 
 . William B. Carter (W)
 . Abraham McClellan (D)
 . Joseph L. Williams (W)
 . Julius W. Blackwell (D)
 . Hopkins L. Turney (D)
 . William B. Campbell (W)
 . John Bell (W)
 . Meredith P. Gentry (W)
 . Harvey M. Watterson (D)
 . Aaron V. Brown (D)
 . Cave Johnson (D)
 . John W. Crockett (W)
 . Christopher H. Williams (W)

Vermont 
 . Hiland Hall (W)
 . William Slade (W)
 . Horace Everett (W)
 . John Smith (D)
 . Isaac Fletcher (D)

Virginia 
 . Joel Holleman (D), until December 1840
 Francis Mallory (W), from December 28, 1840
 . Francis E. Rives (D)
 . John W. Jones (D)
 . George C. Dromgoole (D)
 . John Hill (W)
 . Walter Coles (D)
 . William L. Goggin (W)
 . Henry A. Wise (W)
 . Robert M. T. Hunter (W)
 . John Taliaferro (W)
 . John M. Botts (W)
 . James Garland (C)
 . Linn Banks (D)
 . Charles F. Mercer (W), until December 26, 1839
 William M. McCarty (W), from January 25, 1840
 . William Lucas (D)
 . Green B. Samuels (D)
 . Robert Craig (D)
 . George W. Hopkins (C)
 . Andrew Beirne (D)
 . Joseph Johnson (D)
 . Lewis Steenrod (D)

Non-voting members 
 . Charles Downing
 . William W. Chapman (D), until October 27, 1840
 Augustus C. Dodge (D), from October 28, 1840
 . James D. Doty (D)

Changes in membership
The count below reflects changes from the beginning of the first session of this Congress.

Senate 
 Replacements: 8
 Democrats: 0-seat net loss
 Whigs: 0-seat net gain
 Deaths: 3
 Resignations: 7
 Interim appointments: 0
Total seats with changes: 11

|-
| Tennessee(1)
| colspan=2 style="font-size:80%" | Vacant after previous Congress
|  | Felix Grundy (D)
| Elected November 19, 1839

|-
| New York(1)
| colspan=2 style="font-size:80%" | Vacant after previous Congress
|  | Nathaniel P. Tallmadge (W)
| Elected January 14, 1840

|-
| Pennsylvania(1)
| colspan=2 style="font-size:80%" | Vacant after previous Congress
|  | Daniel Sturgeon (D)
| Elected January 14, 1840
|-
| Michigan(1)
| colspan=2 style="font-size:80%" | Vacant after legislature failed to reelect incumbent.
|  | Augustus S. Porter (W)
| Elected January 20, 1840
|-
| Virginia(1)
| colspan=2 style="font-size:80%" | Vacant after legislature failed to reelect incumbent.
|  | William C. Rives (W)
| Elected January 18, 1841
|-
| Delaware(1)
|  | Richard H. Bayard (W)
| style="font-size:80%" | Resigned September 19, 1839, to become Chief Justice of the Delaware Supreme Court
|  | Richard H. Bayard (W)
| Elected January 12, 1841, to his former position
|-
| Tennessee(2)
|  | Hugh Lawson White (W)
| style="font-size:80%" | Resigned January 13, 1840, because he could not conscientiously obey the intentions of his constituents
|  | Alexander O. Anderson (D)
| Elected February 26, 1840
|-
| Connecticut(1)
|  | Thaddeus Betts (W)
| style="font-size:80%" | Died April 7, 1840
|  | Jabez W. Huntington (W)
| Elected May 4, 1840
|-
| Maryland(3)
|  | John S. Spence (W)
| style="font-size:80%" | Died October 24, 1840
|  | John L. Kerr (W)
| Elected January 5, 1841
|-
| North Carolina(2)
|  | Bedford Brown (D)
| style="font-size:80%" | Resigned November 16, 1840, because he could not obey instructions of the North Carolina General Assembly
|  | Willie P. Mangum (W)
| Elected November 25, 1840
|-
| North Carolina(3)
|  | Robert Strange (D)
| style="font-size:80%" | Resigned November 16, 1840
|  | William A. Graham (W)
| Elected November 25, 1840
|-
| Tennessee(1)
|  | Felix Grundy (D)
| style="font-size:80%" | Died December 19, 1840
|  | Alfred O. P. Nicholson (D)
| Elected December 25, 1840
|-
| Massachusetts(2)
|  | John Davis (W)
| style="font-size:80%" | Resigned January 5, 1841, after being elected Governor of Massachusetts
|  | Isaac C. Bates (W)
| Elected January 13, 1841
|-
| Massachusetts(1)
|  | Daniel Webster (W)
| style="font-size:80%" | Resigned February 22, 1841
|  | Rufus Choate (W)
| Elected February 23, 1841
|}

House of Representatives 
 Replacements: 15
 Democrats: 2-seat net loss
 Whigs: 3-seat net gain
 Anti-Masonic: 1-seat net loss
 Deaths: 6
 Resignations: 10
 Contested election: 0
Total seats with changes: 17

 
|-
| 
| Vacant
| style="font-size:80%" | Rep-elect Howard presented credentials August 5, 1839
|  | Tilghman Howard (D)
| Seated August 5, 1839
|-
| 
|  | Albert G. Harrison (D)
| style="font-size:80%" | Died September 7, 1839
|  | John Jameson (D)
| Seated December 12, 1839
|-
| 
|  | James C. Alvord (W)
| style="font-size:80%" | Died September 27, 1839
|  | Osmyn Baker (W)
| Seated January 14, 1840
|-
| 
|  | William W. Potter (D)
| style="font-size:80%" | Died October 28, 1839
|  | George McCulloch (D)
| Seated November 20, 1839
|-
| 
|  | Charles F. Mercer (W)
| style="font-size:80%" | Resigned December 26, 1839
|  | William M. McCarty (W)
| Seated January 25, 1840
|-
| 
|  | Thomas Corwin (W)
| style="font-size:80%" | Resigned May 30, 1840, having become a candidate for Governor of Ohio
|  | Jeremiah Morrow (W)
| Seated October 13, 1840
|-
| 
|  | William L. Storrs (W)
| style="font-size:80%" | Resigned some time in June, 1840
|  | William W. Boardman (W)
| Seated December 7, 1840
|-
| 
|  | Anson Brown (W)
| style="font-size:80%" | Died June 14, 1840
|  | Nicholas B. Doe (W)
| Seated December 7, 1840
|-
| 
|  | Tilghman Howard (D)
| style="font-size:80%" | Resigned July 1, 1840
|  | Henry S. Lane (W)
| Seated August 3, 1840
|-
| 
|  | Walter T. Colquitt (W)
| style="font-size:80%" | Resigned July 21, 1840
|  | Hines Holt (W)
| Seated February 1, 1841
|-
| 
|  | Rice Garland (W)
| style="font-size:80%" | Resigned July 21, 1840, to accept appointment as judge of Louisiana Supreme Court
|  | John Moore (W)
| Seated December 17, 1840
|-
| 
|  | Richard Biddle (AM)
| style="font-size:80%" | Resigned July 21, 1840
|  | Henry M. Brackenridge (W)
| Seated October 13, 1840
|-
| 
|  | Simeon H. Anderson (W)
| style="font-size:80%" | Died August 11, 1840
|  | John B. Thompson (W)
| Seated December 7, 1840
|-
| 
|  | Abbott Lawrence (W)
| style="font-size:80%" | Resigned September 18, 1840
|  | Robert C. Winthrop (W)
| Seated November 9, 1840
|-
| 
|  | William S. Ramsey (D)
| style="font-size:80%" | Died October 17, 1840
|  | Charles McClure (D)
| Seated December 7, 1840
|-
| 
|  | William W. Chapman (D)
| style="font-size:80%" | Term expired by law October 27, 1840
|  | Augustus C. Dodge (D)
| Seated October 28, 1840
|-
| 
|  | Joel Holleman (D)
| style="font-size:80%" | Resigned in December 1840
|  | Francis Mallory (W)
| Seated December 28, 1840
|-
| 
|  | George Evans (W)
| style="font-size:80%" | Resigned March 3, 1841, after being elected to the US Senate
| Vacant
| Not filled this term
|}

Committees
Lists of committees and their party leaders.

Senate

 Agriculture (Chairman: Alexander Mouton)
 Audit and Control the Contingent Expenses of the Senate (Chairman: Nehemiah R. Knight)
 Claims (Chairman: Henry Hubbard)
 Commerce (Chairman: William R. King) 
 Distributing Public Revenue Among the States (Select)
 District of Columbia (Chairman: Richard H. Bayard)&
 Engrossed Bills (Chairman: Oliver Smith then John Henderson)
 Finance (Chairman: Silas Wright)
 Fiscal Corporation of the United States (Select)
 Foreign Relations (Chairman: James Buchanan)
 Indian Affairs (Chairman: Ambrose H. Sevier)
 Judiciary (Chairman: Garret D. Wall)
 Manufactures (Chairman: Wilson Lumpkin)
 Military Affairs (Chairman: Thomas Hart Benton)
 Militia (Chairman: Clement C. Clay)
 Naval Affairs (Chairman: Reuel Williams)
 Patents and the Patent Office (Chairman: Daniel Sturgeon)
 Pensions (Chairman: Franklin Pierce)
 Post Office and Post Roads (Chairman: John M. Robinson)
 Printing (Chairman: N/A)
 Private Land Claims (Chairman: Lewis F. Linn)
 Public Buildings and Grounds (Chairman: William S. Fulton)
 Public Lands (Chairman: Robert J. Walker)
 Revolutionary Claims (Chairman: Perry Smith) 
 Roads and Canals (Chairman: Richard M. Young)
 Tariff Regulation (Select)
 Whole

House of Representatives

 Accounts (Chairman: Joseph Johnson)
 Agriculture (Chairman: Edmund Deberry)
 Apportionment of Representatives (Select)
 Claims (Chairman: David A. Russell)
 Commerce (Chairman: Edward Curtis)
 District of Columbia (Chairman: William C. Johnson)
 Elections (Chairman: Francis E. Rives)
 Expenditures in the Navy Department (Chairman: Leverett Saltonstall I)
 Expenditures in the Post Office Department (Chairman: Richard P. Marvin)
 Expenditures in the State Department (Chairman: Joseph R. Underwood)
 Expenditures in the Treasury Department (Chairman: George Evans)
 Expenditures in the War Department (Chairman: Peter J. Wagner)
 Expenditures on Public Buildings (Chairman: Edward Stanly)
 Foreign Affairs (Chairman: Francis W. Pickens)
 Indian Affairs (Chairman: John Bell)
 Invalid Pensions (Chairman: Sherrod Williams)
 Judiciary (Chairman: John Sergeant)
 Manufactures (Chairman: John Quincy Adams)
 Memorial of the Agricultural Bank of Mississippi (Select)
 Mileage (Chairman: Thomas W. Williams)
 Military Affairs (Chairman: Cave Johnson until 1840, then Waddy Thompson Jr.)
 Militia (Chairman: George M. Keim)
 Naval Affairs (Chairman: Francis Thomas)
 Patents (Chairman: Issac Fletcher)
 Post Office and Post Roads (Chairman: James I. McKay)
 Private Land Claims (Chairman: William B. Calhoun)
 Public Buildings and Grounds (Chairman: Stephen B. Leonard)
 Public Expenditures (Chairman: William K. Bond)
 Public Lands (Chairman: Thomas Corwin 1839-1840, then Samson Mason 1840, then Jeremiah Morrow)
 Revisal and Unfinished Business (Chairman: Luther C. Peck)
 Revolutionary Claims (Chairman: Joseph F. Randolph)
 Revolutionary Pensions (Chairman: John Taliaferro)
 Roads and Canals (Chairman: Charles Ogle)
 Rules (Select)
 Standards of Official Conduct
 Territories (Chairman: John Pope)
 Ways and Means (Chairman: John W. Jones)
 Whole

Joint committees

 Enrolled Bills (Chairman: Sen. Benjamin Tappan)
 The Library (Chairman: N/A)

Employees 
 Librarian of Congress: John Silva Meehan

Senate 
Chaplain: Henry Slicer (Methodist), until December 31, 1839
 George G. Cookman (Methodist), from December 31, 1839
Secretary: Asbury Dickins
Sergeant at Arms: Stephen Haight

House of Representatives 
Chaplain: Levi M. Reese (Methodist), until February 4, 1840
 Joshua Bates (Congregationalist), elected February 4, 1840
 Thomas W. Braxton (Baptist), elected December 7, 1840
Clerk: Hugh A. Garland
Doorkeeper: Joseph Follansbee, elected December 23, 1839
Postmaster: William J. McCormick, elected December 23, 1839
Reading Clerks: 
Sergeant at Arms: Roderick Dorsey

See also 
 1838 United States elections (elections leading to this Congress)
 1838–39 United States Senate elections
 1838–39 United States House of Representatives elections
 1840 United States elections (elections during this Congress, leading to the next Congress)
 1840 United States presidential election
 1840–41 United States Senate elections
 1840–41 United States House of Representatives elections

Notes

References

External links
Statutes at Large, 1789-1875
Senate Journal, First Forty-three Sessions of Congress
House Journal, First Forty-three Sessions of Congress
Biographical Directory of the U.S. Congress
U.S. House of Representatives: House History
U.S. Senate: Statistics and Lists